Giannis Tsivelekidis (born 4 June 1999) is a Greek professional footballer who plays as a centre-back for Meistriliiga club Nõmme Kalju, for which he is captain.

References

1999 births
Living people
Greek expatriate footballers
Super League Greece players
Football League (Greece) players
Slovenian Second League players
AEK Athens F.C. players
Kalamata F.C. players
NK Fužinar players
Association football defenders
Footballers from Athens
Greek footballers